Francis Bowditch Wilby (April 24, 1883 – November 20, 1965) was a major general in the United States Army who served as the 39th Superintendent of the United States Military Academy from 1942 to 1945, during World War II.

Early years and WW I

Francis Bowditch Wilby was born on April 24, 1883, in Detroit, Michigan. Raised in Deerfield, Massachusetts, he graduated from the Deerfield Academy. Wilby then attended the United States Military Academy at West Point, New York and graduated third in the Class of 1905. He was commissioned as a second lieutenant in the Corps of Engineers on June 13, 1905.

Wilby was promoted to the rank of first lieutenant on June 7, 1907, and in September of the same year, he was ordered to the Washington, D.C., where he attended the Engineer School at Washington Barracks (now Fort Lesley J. McNair).

Wilby also served with the United States forces during the United States occupation of Cuba between years 1906–1909.

When the U.S. entered World War I, Wilby was transferred to France with the American Expeditionary Force. His first assignment with the AEF was as the Instructor of 1st Corps Engineer School in Gondrecourt-le-Château. He also attended the French engineer school at Chalons-sur-Marne.

On March 20, 1918, Wilby was transferred to the Chaumont-Porcien Headquarters of the American Expeditionary Force, where he was appointed as Chief of Engineers Intelligence Division in the Office of Chief of Engineers.

On September 26, 1918, Wilby was transferred to the 1st Infantry Division under command of Major General Robert Lee Bullard, where he was appointed as a Commander of 1st Engineers. Wilby stayed in this capacity until March 14, 1919, where he was ordered back to the United States.

For his distinguished service during World War I, Wilby was awarded with Army Distinguished Service Medal by the Government of the United States and with the Croix de Guerre with Palm of the Government of France.

Distinguished Service Medal Citation

The official U.S. Army citation for Wilby's Distinguished Service Medal reads:

General Orders: War Department, General Orders No. 14 (1923)
Action Date: World War I
Name: Francis Bowditch Wilby
Service: Army
Rank: Colonel
Company: Chief Engineer
Division: American Expeditionary Force
Citation: The President of the United States of America, authorized by Act of Congress, July 9, 1918, takes pleasure in presenting the Army Distinguished Service Medal to Colonel (Corps of Engineers) Francis Bowditch Wilby (ASN: 0-2023), United States Army, for exceptionally meritorious and distinguished services to the Government of the United States, in a duty of great responsibility during World War I. As Assistant in charge of Military Engineering in the Office of the Chief Engineer, American Expeditionary Forces, and later as Division Engineer of the 1st Division, Colonel Wilby displayed unusual ability and professional attainments of a high order. As Editor of the Engineer Field Notes, and as the author of a large number of them, his clear conception of the functions and duties of Engineer troops was most firmly impressed upon the Combat Engineers and contributed in a signal manner to their marked efficiency. By his rare technical skill and knowledge, keen adaptability to all conditions, he contributed materially to the success of the 1st Division in a position of great responsibility and in times and circumstances of the gravest importance.

Between wars

Wilby graduated from the School of the Line in 1922, the General Staff School in 1923, and the Army War College in 1924. He then served on the War Department General Staff from 1924 to 1928.

Wilby was transferred to Governors Island, New York, where he was appointed as a chief of staff of the First United States Army under the command of Lieutenant General Hugh A. Drum on October 26, 1939. He was also promoted to the rank of brigadier general on October 1, 1940.

World War II

In July 1941, Wilby was appointed as the commanding general of the First Corps Area Service Command, just renamed from First Corps Area. Wilby was promoted to the rank of major general on September 29, 1941.

On January 13, 1942, Wilby was selected to be appointed as Superintendent of the United States Military Academy and stayed in this capacity for the whole of World War II until September 4, 1945.

His last military assignment was at Fort Belvoir in Fairfax County, Virginia, where he served as a commander of the Engineer school until January 31, 1946, when he finally retired from the Army.

Retirement

After his retirement from the Army, Wilby was appointed as a chairman of the New York Power Authority and served in this capacity until 1950. Then he worked as a consultant engineer of the Knappen Tibbetts Abbeit Company until his final retirement in 1952.

Wilby settled in Asheville, North Carolina and died on November 20, 1965, at the age of 82 at the Oteen Veterans' Administration Hospital. He is buried at the United States Military Academy Post Cemetery in West Point, New York, together with his first wife Dorothy Langfitt Wilby (1887–1948). His second wife Olive Logan (Emerson) Payne (1896–1983) was buried beside them after her death.

Decorations
Here is the ribbon bar of Major General Wilby:

References

External links
 

1883 births
1965 deaths
People from Deerfield, Massachusetts
Deerfield Academy alumni
United States Military Academy alumni
Military personnel from Detroit
Military personnel from Massachusetts
United States Army Corps of Engineers personnel
United States Army personnel of World War I
Recipients of the Distinguished Service Medal (US Army)
Recipients of the Croix de Guerre 1914–1918 (France)
United States Army Command and General Staff College alumni
United States Army War College alumni
Recipients of the Legion of Merit
United States Army generals
United States Army generals of World War II
Superintendents of the United States Military Academy
People from Asheville, North Carolina
Burials at West Point Cemetery
20th-century American academics